Roxy Lee Gordon (March 7, 1945 – February 7, 2000) was an American poet, novelist, musician, multimedia artist, and activist. Described as a "progressive country witness and outlaw poet," Gordon often used spoken vocals accompanied by music that mixed Native American rhythms with country and Western themes and musicians working in Texas.

Background and education 
Gordon was raised and lived later in his life in Talpa, Texas. He identified as being of Choctaw and Assiniboine ancestry.

Publishing 
In the late 1960s, his wife Judy and he lived in Lodge Pole, Montana, where he published the Fort Belknap Notes, a newsletter of the Fort Belknap reservation. In the 1970s, they moved to Albuquerque, New Mexico, and ran a country-music magazine, Picking up the Tempo. Gordon was also involved in the American Indian Movement and helped found a local chapter in Dallas. His writing was featured in Rolling Stone and the Village Voice and he ran a small publishing company called Wowapi.

Writing 
In addition to music and spoken word, Gordon published six books and more than 200 poems, articles, and short fiction; he also coauthored two plays with his wife. Gordon had a following in England as well as the U.S., and his circle included singer-songwriter Townes Van Zandt and others who respected poetic narratives.

Works 
His works include:

Some Things I Did (1979), 
Breeds (1984) Austin, Tex.: Place of Herons,  
Unfinished Business (1985)
At Play in the Lord's Fields (1986)
West-Texas Mid Century (1988)
Crazy Horse Never Died (1989)
Kerrville Live (1993)
Revolution in the Air (1995)
Smaller Circles (1997) 
Townes Asked Did Hank Williams Ever Write Anything as Good as Nothing (2001)

References 

1945 births
2000 deaths
20th-century American musicians
American people of Choctaw descent
Native Americans' rights activists
American male musicians
American male writers